Santiago Carpintero Fernández (born 28 September 1976 in León) is a Spanish retired footballer who played as a midfielder.

External links

1976 births
Living people
Spanish footballers
Footballers from Castile and León
Association football midfielders
La Liga players
Segunda División players
Segunda División B players
Cultural Leonesa footballers
Real Oviedo Vetusta players
Albacete Balompié players
FC Cartagena footballers
CD Toledo players
Levante UD footballers
Deportivo Alavés players
Málaga CF players
Córdoba CF players